"Ballad of Forty Dollars" is a song written and recorded by American country music artist Tom T. Hall. It was released in October 1968 as the fourth and final single from the album of the same name, Ballad of Forty Dollars. The song was Hall's first top 10 on the U.S. country singles chart, peaking at number 4 on both the U.S. chart and the Canadian country singles chart.

Content 

The song is narrated by a cemetery caretaker. He observes the funeral of a man and the people coming bid him farewell, the preacher, the great-uncle’s limousine, his grieving wife, the military "Taps" (as he probably was a war veteran), and the gossip about his estate.

Background 
Hall took this song, as many of his hits, from personal experience; he was working with his aunt on a cemetery and was observing many funerals and the people coming, then talking about the guy who owed him 40 dollars. He said: “You're certainly not going to go to the widow and collect it. I guess it's lost.”

Chart performance

References 

1968 singles
Tom T. Hall songs
Songs written by Tom T. Hall
Song recordings produced by Jerry Kennedy
Mercury Records singles
1968 songs